Emaz Uddin Pramanik (born 16 February 1941) is a Bangladesh Awami League politician and the incumbent Jatiya Sangsad member from Naogaon-4 constituency, and a former Minister of Textiles and Jute.

Career 
In 1970 Pakistani general election, Pramanik was elected to parliament for the first time. In 2018 election, he won for the eighth time including 1970. In 2016, he was awarded Independence Day Award, the highest state award given by the government of Bangladesh, for his contribution in the Bangladesh Liberation War.

References

Living people
1941 births
Awami League politicians
Textiles and Jute ministers of Bangladesh
3rd Jatiya Sangsad members
9th Jatiya Sangsad members
10th Jatiya Sangsad members
Recipients of the Independence Day Award
11th Jatiya Sangsad members
Place of birth missing (living people)
People from Naogaon District